Žana Jereb (born 17 June 1984 in Kranj) is a Slovenian long-distance runner. She competed in the marathon at the 2012 Summer Olympics, placing 88th with a time of 2:42:50.

References

External links
 
 
 

1984 births
Living people
Slovenian female long-distance runners
Olympic athletes of Slovenia
Athletes (track and field) at the 2012 Summer Olympics
Sportspeople from Kranj